The Alfee is a Japanese folk rock band who debuted in 1974, and have been recording and touring since then, with 23 studio albums and 63 singles throughout their career. The band  marked its 40th anniversary in 2014 with their 64th single.

History
Masaru Sakurai, Konosuke Sakazaki, Toshihiko Takamizawa, and Yasuo Miyake met in 1973 while students at Meiji Gakuin University, and formed the group Alfie. On August 25, 1974, they released their first single "Natsu Shigure". Around 1975, Miyake left the group, leaving the remaining group a trio. In 2003, HMV's Japanese branch ranked them number 92 in their "Top 100 Japanese pops Artists" list.

The Alfee claims American folk music as their primary inspiration, but they do also take from heavy metal, hard rock, progressive rock, and Japan's "new wave". The group also takes inspiration from King Crimson, Yes, Emerson, Lake & Palmer, and Pink Floyd, as they use odd time signatures, while also taking the chorus harmonies of Simon & Garfunkel, the Eagles, Crosby, Stills, Nash & Young, and Queen.

Members
: Born  in Chichibu, Saitama. Vocals, bass, chorus, pedal synthesizer, double bass, and acoustic guitar.
: Born  in Sumida, Tokyo. Vocals, acoustic guitar, mandolin, percussion, drums, harmonica, electric guitar, bass, ukulele, banjo, sitar, lute, dobro, autoharp, bouzouki, tenor guitar, piano, and chorus.
: Born  in Warabi, Saitama. Vocals, electric guitar, acoustic guitar, mandolin, piano, chorus. The group's leader and producer. Also has a solo career as "Takamiy".

Discography

Albums
Titles are listed chronologically, oldest at the top. The titles are listed in English translation first, followed by the original Japanese, (a rōmaji transliteration in parentheses) and the release date in parentheses (if known). If an album title is in English, the title will be shown only once.

Youthful Memories青春の記憶 (Seishun no Kioku) (July 25, 1975)
Time and Tide (August 21, 1979)
Sanjūshi讃集詩 (Sanjūshi) (May 21, 1980)
Almighty (October 21, 1981)
doubt, (April 21, 1982)
Alfee (January 5, 1983)
Alfee's Law (September 5, 1983)
Page One: 13 Pieces of Alfee (December 5, 1983)
The Renaissance (July 5, 1984)
Alfee Gold (September 5, 1984)
Alfee Silver (September 5, 1984)
Best Selection I (December 5, 1984)
Alfee A-Side CollectionALFEE A面 コレクション (Alfee A-men Korekushon) (May 21, 1985)
Alfee B-Side CollectionALFEE B面 コレクション (Alfee B-men Korekushon) (May 21, 1985)
For Your Love (June 19, 1985)
Alfee 4-Way Story (1) (August 21, 1985)
Alfee 4-Way Story (2) (August 21, 1985)
The Best Song (December 5, 1985)
Alfee A-Side Collection SpecialアルフィーA面コレクション スペシャル (Arufi- A-men Korekushon Supesharu) (April 21, 1986)
Alfee B-Side Collection SpecialアルフィーB面コレクション スペシャル (Arufi- B-men Korekushon Supesharu) (April 21, 1986)
Ages (November 25, 1986)
Non-Stop (December 21, 1986)
One Night Dreams 1983-1987: Special Live Edition (September 17, 1987)
UK Breakfast (December 9, 1987)
Best Selection II (May 21, 1988)
DNA Communication (March 21, 1989)
The Alfee Classics with London Symphony Orchestra (March 21, 1990)
Arcadia (October 17, 1990)
The Alfee: The Best (December 4, 1991)
Journey (April 29, 1992)
Promised Love: The Alfee Ballad Selection (December 16, 1992)
Confidence: The Alfee Acoustic Special Live (July 21, 1993)
Single History I: 1979-1982 (September 20, 1994)
Single History II: 1983-1986 (November 20, 1994)
Single History III: 1987-1990 (December 20, 1994)
To the End of the Dream夢幻の果てに (Mugen no Hate ni) (January 20, 1995)
Single History IV: 1991-1994 (February 20, 1995)
Live in Progress (July 21, 1995)
Love (March 21, 1996)
The Alfee Classics II: The Alfee with Royal Philharmonic Orchestra (December 16, 1996)
Emotional Love Songs (November 19, 1997)
Emotional Message Songs (November 19, 1997)
Nouvelle Vague (March 25, 1998)
Pride (August 7, 1998)
ōrb (September 29, 1999)
Glint Beat (September 12, 2001)
Glint Beat included the songs "BOY" and "Fairy Dance", the opening and ending songs (respectively) of the SKY PerfecTV anime "Figure 17: Tsubasa & Hikaru".
The Alfee Classics III: The Alfee with Royal Philharmonic Orchestra (November 16, 2001)
The Best 1997-2002: apres nouvelle vague (March 5, 2003)
Going My Way (October 1, 2003)
Racing to the Dream: The Osaka International Ladies Marathon Image Song Album夢よ急げ-大阪国際女子マラソンイメージソング・アルバム- (Yume yo Isoge - Ōsaka Kokusai Joshi Marason Ime-ji Songu Arubamu) (March 10, 2004)
The Alfee 30th Anniversary Hit Single Collection 37 (August 25, 2004)
Starting Over: Best Hit of The Alfee (March 29, 2006)
ONE -Venus of Rock- (November 22, 2006)
Alfee Gets Requests (July 25, 2012)
Sanmi Ittai (三位一体) (December 23, 2015)

Singles
Titles are listed chronologically, oldest at the top. The titles are listed in their English translation first, followed by the original Japanese, (a rōmaji transliteration in parentheses) and the release date in parentheses. If all songs on a single are in English, the titles are shown only once.

1970s

"Summer Shower / Dangerous Apple"夏しぐれ／危険なリンゴ (Natsu Shigure / Kiken na Ringo) (August 25, 1974)
"Youthful Memories / Midsummer Dream"青春の記憶／真夏の夢 (Seishun no Kioku / Manatsu no Yume) (May 25, 1975)
"Love Letter / Long Lost Days"ラブレター／過ぎ去りし日々 (Rabu Reta- / Sugisarishi Hibi) (January 21, 1979)
"Love Letter" was the "image song" for the 1978 commercial "Shouwa Note."
"Like the Dancing Girl / The Goodbye Was Nonchalant"踊り子のように／さよならはさりげなく (Odoriko no you ni / Sayonara ha Sarigenaku) (April 21, 1979)
"In the Night of Falling Stars... / Street Corner Hero"星降る夜に...／街角のヒーロー (Hoshi Furu Yoru ni... / Machikado no Hi-ro-) (July 21, 1979)
"Jack Frost / The Farewell Bell"冬将軍／さよならの鐘 (Fuyu Shougun / Sayonara no Kane) (October 21, 1979)

1980s

"Pantomime / Toward the Reckless Tears of Tomorrow"無言劇／明日なき暴走の果てに (Mugongeki / Ashita naki Bousou no Hate ni) (March 21, 1980)
"Pantomime" was the theme song for the 1980 TV Tokyo drama "Aitsu to Ore."
"Beautiful Season / Feeling Love"美しいシーズン／Feeling Love (Utsukushii Shi-zun / Feeling Love) (June 21, 1980)
"Beautiful Season" was the theme song for the 1980 Toei Eiga release "Furyou Shounen."
"I Want to Be Your Lover / Check Out"恋人になりたい／CHECK OUT (Koibito ni Naritai / Check Out) (November 5, 1980)
"The Letter with No Forwarding Address / Northern Hotel"宛先のない手紙／北のHOTEL (Atesaki no Nai Tegami / Kita no Hotel) (May 21, 1981)
"Rain Shower / Weather That Can't Be Described in Words"通り雨／言葉にしたくない天気 (Toori Ame / Kotoba ni Shitakunai Tenki) (October 21, 1979)
"Don't Cry My Love / Last Kiss by Morning Call"泣かないでMY LOVE／モーニング・コールでラスト・キッス (Nakanai de My Love / Mo-ningu Ko-ru de Rasuto Kissu) (March 21, 1982)
"Sunset Summer / Suppressed Insanity! Jumping Groupie"SUNSET SUMMER／絶狂！ジャンピング・グルーピー (Sunset Summer / Zekkyou! Janpingu Guru-pi-) (June 21, 1982)
"Parting Rhythm / Elegy"別れの律動（リズム）／挽歌 (Wakare no Ritsudou (Rizumu) / Banka) (November 21, 1982)
"Daybreak Paradise Road / Prayer"暁のパラダイス・ロード／祈り (Akatsuki no Paradaisu Ro-do / Inori) (March 21, 1983)
"Marie-Anne / Radical Teenager"メリーアン／ラジカル・ティーンエイジャー (Meri-an / Rajikaru Ti-neija-) (June 21, 1983)
"Starry Sky Distance / Downtown Street"星空のディスタンス／DOWNTOWN STREET (Hoshizora no Disutansu / Downtown Street) (January 21, 1984)
"Starry Sky Distance" was the theme song for the 1984 TBS Network TV drama "Mujaki na Kankei."
"Starship: Seeking the Light / The Beat of Love"STARSHIP－光を求めて－／愛の鼓動 (Starship -Hikari wo Motomete / Ai no Kodou) (May 21, 1984)
"Starship: Seeking the Light" was the "peace theme" for the 1984 movie "SF Shinseki Lensman".
"The Beat of Love" was the "love theme" for the 1984 movie "SF Shinseki Lensman".
"Pavement of Lovers / Rollover Yesterday"恋人達のペイヴメント／ロールオーバー・イエスタディ (Koibitotachi no Peivumento / Ro-ruo-ba- Iesutadi) (October 17, 1984)
"Pavement of Lovers" was the image song for the 1984 Glico "Almond Chocolate" commercial.
"Cinderella Isn't Sleepy / A Last Song"シンデレラは眠れない／A Last Song (Shinderera ha Nemurenai / A Last Song) (February 21, 1985)
"Cinderella Isn't Sleepy" was the spring 1985 image song for Kanebou Keshouhin.
"Foggy Sofia / Blue Age Revolution"霧のソフィア／BLUE AGE REVOLUTION (Kiri no Sofia / Blue Age Revolution) (October 16, 1985)
"Windy Day, with You / The Tale of the Worldly and Melancholy Man"風曜日、君をつれて／世にも悲しい男の物語 (Fūyōbi, Kimi wo Tsurete / Yo ni mo Kanashii Otoko no Monogatari) (March 5, 1986)
"Windy Day, with You" was the summer 1985 Okinawa campaign song for All Nippon Airways.
"Sweat & Tears / Explain the Wind"SWEAT & TEARS／風よ教えて (Sweat & Tears / Kaze yo Oshiete) (July 5, 1986)
"Rockdom: Blowing in the Wind / Days Gone By"ROCKDOM －風に吹かれて－／DAYS GONE BY (Rockdom: Kaze ni Fukarete / Days Gone By) (September 5, 1986)
"Sapphire Eyes / Embraced by the Wintry Wind"サファイアの瞳／木枯しに抱かれて... (Safaia no Hitomi / Kogarashi ni Idakarete) (March 11, 1987)
"Sapphire Eyes" was the 1987 image song for the Lion "Page One" commercial campaign.
"Don't Pass Me By / For the Brand-New Dream"君が通り過ぎたあとに －DON'T PASS ME BY－／FOR THE BRAND－NEW DREAM (Kimi ga Tōrisugita Ato ni -Don't Pass Me By- / For the Brand-New Dream) (March 11, 1987)
"Don't Pass Me By" was the theme song for the 1987 Toho Eiga anime movie "Touch 3".
"For the Brand-New Dream" was the ending theme song for the 1987 Toho Eiga anime movie "Touch 3".
"A Hundred Nights / Long Way to Freedom"白夜－byaku－ya－／LONG WAY TO FREEDOM (Byaku-ya / Long Way to Freedom) (July 1, 1987)
"Long Way to Freedom" was the 1987 Alps Denki commercial campaign image song.
"My Truth / It's Alright" (October 28, 1987)
"It's Alright" was used by the 1988 Osaka International Ladies Marathon.
"Don't Forget the January Rain / Girl"１月の雨を忘れない／Girl (1-gatsu no Ame wo Wasurenai / Girl) (January 21, 1988)
"It's Alright" was the 1988 Fuji network "Momoiro Gakuentoshi" theme song.
"Weekend Shuffle: Gorgeous Weekend / I Want to Gaze at You"WEEKEND SHUFFLE－華やかな週末－／見つめていたい (Weekend Shuffle - Hanayaka na Shūmatsu / Mitsumeteitai) (March 16, 1988)
"Weekend Shuffle: Gorgeous Weekend" was theme song for the 1988 TBS network drama "Papa ha Nenjū Kurō-suru".
"I Want to Gaze at You" was a song used in the 1988 TBS network drama "Papa ha Nenjū Kurō-suru".
"19 / Outlaw Blues"19（nineteen）／アウトロー・ブルース (19 / Autoro- Buru-su) (July 27, 1988)
"Faith of Love / You Get to Run" (December 21, 1988)
"Faith of Love" was the main theme for the 1988 Toho Eiga movie "Gekitotsu".
"You Get to Run" was the Fighting theme for the 1988 Toho Eiga movie "Gekitotsu".
"I Can Hear the Songs of My Lover / Alone: And the Road Goes On"恋人の歌がきこえる／Alone－それでも道はつづく－ (Koibito no Uta ga Kikoeru / Alone -Sore demo Michi ha Tsuzuku) (October 25, 1989)
"I Can Hear the Songs of My Lover" was the theme song for the 1989 NTV drama "I Can Hear the Songs of My Lover".
1990s

"Flower Revolution / Bad Girl" (January 31, 1990)
"Flower Revolution" was the image song for Expo '90 and the 1990 Osaka International Ladies Marathon.
"Promised Love / Someday" (February 5, 1992)
"Promised Love" was the theme song for the 1992 NTV drama "Pole Position! Aishiki Hito he...".
"Someday" was the image song for the 1992 Osaka International Ladies Marathon.
"Believe / Running Wild" (February 3, 1993)
"Believe" was the theme song for the 1992 TBS network show "Move".
"Running Wild" was the image song for the 1993 Osaka International Ladies Marathon.
"Victory / Time Spirit" (April 28, 1993)
"Victory" was the official song of the J.League club Yokohama Flugels.
"I Want to Meet You Once Again / Chasing Down the Wind"もう一度君に逢いたい／風を追いかけて (Mou Ichidō Kimi ni Aitai / Kaze wo Oikakete) (December 1, 1993)
"I Want to Meet You Once Again" was the ending theme for the 1992 NTV drama "Super TV: Jōhō Saizensen".
"Chasing Down the Wind" was the image song for the 1994 Osaka International Ladies Marathon.
"Haven't Yet Seen the Love Poem to You / Power for Love"まだ見ぬ君への愛の詩／愛こそ力 ～Power for Love～ (Mada Minu Kimi he no Ai no Shi / Ai koso Chikara ~Power for Love~) (May 14, 1994)
"Haven't Yet Seen the Love Poem to You" was the image song for the 1994 Mitsuya Cider commercial campaign.
"Power for Love" was the ending theme for the 1994 Fuji network show "Time Angle".
"Complex Blue: Except for the Love, I'm Too Sad / Theme of Romance / Theme of Solitude"COMPLEX BLUE －愛だけ哀しすぎて－/ THEME OF ROMANCE / THEME OF SOLITUDE (Complex Blue -Ai dake Kanashisugite / Theme of Romance / Theme of Solitude) (September 20, 1994)
"Complex Blue: Except for the Love, I'm Too Sad" was the theme song for the 1994 Fuji network video series "Complex Blue".
"The Adventurers / El Dorado"冒険者たち／El Dorado (Bōkensha-tachi / El Dorado) (October 20, 1994)
"The Adventurers" was the theme song for the 1994 NHK network anime series "Montana Jones".
"El Dorado / The Adventure Begins"エルドラド／The Adventure Begins (Eru Dorado / The Adventure Begins) (October 20, 1994)
"El Dorado" was the ending theme for the 1994 NHK network anime series "Montana Jones".
"Love Never Dies / Glory Days" (January 29, 1996)
"Love Never Dies" was the theme song for the 1996 NTV drama "Kiseki no Romance".
"Glory Days" was the image song for the 1996 Osaka International Ladies Marathon.
"The Shape of Love: Send My Heart / Everybody Needs Love Generation"倖せのかたち ～Send My Heart～／EVERYBODY NEEDS LOVE GENERATION－Live at YOKOHAMA RED BRICKS, 10 August 1996－ (Shiawase no Katachi ~Send My Heart~ / Everybody Needs Love Generation) (October 16, 1996)
"The Shape of Love: Send My Heart" was the song for the 1996 Tōhō Seimei commercial campaign.
"Brave Love: Galaxy Express 999 / Beyond the Win" (February 25, 1998)
"Brave Love: Galaxy Express 999" was the theme song for the 1998 Toei anime movie "Galaxy Express 999: Eternal Fantasy".
"Beyond the Win" was the image song for the 1998 Osaka International Ladies Marathon.
"The Bell of Hope as the Morning Breaks / Beginning of the Time"希望の鐘が鳴る朝に／Beginning of the Time (Kibō no Kane ga Naru Asa ni / Beginning of the Time) (February 3, 1999)
"The Bell of Hope as the Morning Breaks" was the theme song for the 1999 TBS network Toshiba Nichiyō Gekijō movie "Salaryman Kintarō".
"Beginning of the Time" was the image song for the 1999 Osaka International Ladies Marathon.
"Justice for True Love / A.D. 1999" (August 18, 1999)
"Justice for True Love" was the theme song for the 1999 anime movie "Kindaichi Shōnen no Jikenbo 2: Satsuriku no Deep Blue".

2000s

"Never Fade / Wake Up: Goodbye 20th Century Boy / In Order to Become Free"NEVER FADE／Wake Up ～Goodbye 20th century boy／自由になるために (Never Fade / Wake Up ~Goodbye 20th Century Boy~ / Jiyū ni Naru Tame ni) (December 6, 2000)
"Never Fade" was the ending theme for the TV Asahi program "T x 2Show".
"Wake Up: Goodbye 20th Century Boy" was the ending theme for the Yomiuri TV/NTV program "Wake Up".
"In Order to Become Free" was the image song for the 2000 Osaka International Ladies Marathon.
"Juliet / Change the Wind" (August 22, 2001)
"Juliet" was the theme song for the TV Asahi program "Sushi Azarashi" and the ending theme for the TV Asahi program "T x 2Show".
"Change the Wind" was the image song for the 2001 Osaka International Ladies Marathon.
"The Sun Won't Set / World of Chaos"太陽は沈まない／Chaosの世界 (Taiyō ha Shizumanai / Chaos no Sekai) (August 14, 2002)
"The Sun Won't Set" was the ending theme song for the Fuji network drama "Shomuni FINAL".
"World of Chaos" was the image song for the 2002 Osaka International Ladies Marathon.
"Dandelion Verse / Swinging Generation 2003"タンポポの詩／SWINGING GENERATION 2003 (Tanpopo no Uta / Swinging Generation 2003) (August 13, 2003)
"Dandelion Verse" was the ending theme for the TV Asahi anime "Doraemon".
"Bridge of Hope / Eyeing the Morning Star / The Bell of Hope as the Morning Breaks: 2004 Mix Version"希望の橋／夜明けの星を目指して／希望の鐘が鳴る朝に ～2004 mix version～ (Kibō no Hashi / Yoake no Hoshi wo Mezashite / Kibō no Kane ga Naru Asa ni) (February 18, 2004)
"Bridge of Hope" was the theme song for the TBS network drama "Salaryman Kintarō 4".
"Eyeing the Morning Star" was the image song for the 2004 Osaka International Ladies Marathon.
"10 Billion Love Stories / Closer to ZeRo! / The Time of Vanishing Loneliness '05"100億のLove Story／ZeRoになれ！／悲しみが消える時'05 (100 Oku no Love Story / ZeRo ni Nare! / Kanashimi ga Kieru Toki '05) (2005-03-17)
"10 Billion Love Stories" was the theme song for the TBS network original movie "Kochira Hon'ike Gamisho 5."
"Closer to ZeRo!" was the image song for the 2005 Osaka International Ladies Marathon.
"Innocent Love / One" (October 24, 2006)
"Innocent Love" was the theme to the drama "Mikon Roku Shimai."
"Dear My Life"(April 4, 2007)
The "Dear My Life" single was released in three different versions, each with a different bonus track.
"Type A" had "Dear My Life" Acoustic Guitar Instrumental as the bonus track.
"Type B" had "Yume Yo Isoge" (夢よ急げ) Acoustic Guitar Instrumental as the bonus track.
"Type C" had "Dear My Life' Instrumental with Electric Guitar Melody."
"Dedicate My Love" (2009)
"Kono Ai wo Sasagete" was the theme song of the anime movie Uchuu Senkan Yamato Fukkatsu-hen
The "Kono Ai wo Sasagete" single is released in three versions, each with a different bonus track.
"Type A" had "Uchuu Senkan Yamato 2009" Rock Version as the bonus track.
"Type B" had "Uchuu Senkan Yamato 2009 with Symphonic Orchestra" as the bonus track.
"Type C" had "Shining Run (Kagayaku Michi Ni Mukatte)" as the bonus track.

2010s
"Let It Go" (May 3, 2011)
"Ikiyou (生きよう; Live)" ( March 14, 2012)
"Final Wars! / Mou Ichidou Koko Kara Hajimeyou (もう一度ここから始めよう; Let's start from here again" (February 20, 2013)
"GLORIOUS" (November 13, 2013)
"Eiyuu no Uta (英雄の詩; Poem of Hero)" (August 26, 2014)
"Kyou no Tsudzuki ga Mirai ni Naru (今日のつづきが未来になる; Today's continuation is in the future)" (May 25, 2016)

Video releases
Titles are listed chronologically, oldest at the top. The titles are listed in English translation first, followed by the original Japanese, (a rōmaji transliteration in parentheses) and the original release date of the video in parentheses (if known). If title is in English, the title will be shown only once.

VHS
Over Drive 1983 Alfee 8.24 Budokan (October 21, 1983)
Flying Away Alfee in Yokohama Stadium 1984.8.3 Fri (September 21, 1984)
Alfee 3 Days 1985.8/27/28/29 Yokohama Stadium (October 15, 1985)
The Alfee 1986 8.3 Sweat & Tears Tokyo Bay-Area (October 5, 1986)
1986 12.24 Christmas Special All Night The Alfee (May 21, 1987)
Sunset－Sunrise 1987 Aug.8-9 (September 30, 1987)
Meigaku Live 3 November 1987 (June 21, 1988)
All Over Japan 4 Access Area 1988 (October 5, 1988)
The Alfee in CrashTHE ALFEE in 激突 (The Alfee in Gekitotsu) (December 21, 1988)
The Alfee with Jean Paul Gaultier (June 14, 1989)
U.S. Camp Drake ASC The ALfee 1989.8.13 Sun (October 4, 1989)
Bridge Across the Future Reel I (October 3, 1990)
Bridge Across the Future Reel II (October 3, 1990)
The Alfee History I 1982～1985 (October 3, 1990)
Arcadia Included by Count Down 1999 (November 21, 1990)
Long Way to Freedom Revolution II & Smile Photo Collection (March 27, 1991)
10th Summer: Since 199110 回目の夏 －Since 1991- (10kaime no Natsu -Since 1991-) (October 2, 1991)
The Alfee History II 1986～1991 (March 25, 1992)
Just Live! (October 7, 1992)
Video Clips Victory (July 21, 1993)
Victory Stadium Silver Night Special (October 21, 1993)
Victory Stadium Gold Night Special (October 21, 1993)
King's Night Dream Western Conference Final (October 5, 1994)
King's Night Dream Eastern Conference Final (October 5, 1994)
Phantom Night Festival: Red Phantom Eve幻夜祭 Red Phantom Eve (Gen'yosai Red Phantom Eve) (October 4, 1995)
Phantom Night Festival: Blue Phantom Eve幻夜祭 Blue Phantom Eve (Gen'yosai Blue Phantom Eve) (October 4, 1995)
1982-1997 Osaka International Ladies Marathon Song by The Alfee1982－1994大阪国際女子マラソンSong by THE ALFEE (1982-1994 Osaka Kokusai Joshi Marason Song by The Alfee) (January 19, 1996)
Yokohama Red Bricks I (October 2, 1996)
Yokohama Red Bricks II (October 2, 1996)
The Alfee Classics: FusionThe Alfee Classics ～融合～ (The Alfee Classics ~Yūgō~) (March 19, 1997)
Emotional Field Heat & Beat Emotion I (October 16, 1997)
Emotional Field Heat & Beat Emotion II (October 16, 1997)
The Alfee History III 1992～1997 (October 17, 1997)
Tokyo One Night Dream (October 16, 1998)
The Alfee in NY at Forest Hills Stadium 1st. July.1998 (December 16, 1998)
Millennium Carnival I (October 14, 1999)
Millennium Carnival II (November 17, 1999)
The Alfee in Berlin at Brandenburg Tour 26th, September 1999 (December 22, 1999)
The Alfee Millennium Final in Osaka －Live at Osakajyo-Hall “A.D.1999” (March 16, 2000)
Tokyo Aube Stadium Alfee Classics Night (October 16, 2000)
Tokyo Aube Stadium Alfee Rockdom Night (October 16, 2000)
The Alfee: The Best Ten & "The Surprise on that Day!" Complete Edition 2000THE ALFEE ザ・ベストテン＆「ある日ィ突然！」Complete edition 2000 (The ALfee Za Besuto Ten & "Aru Hii Totsuzen!" Complete Edition 2000) (December 22, 2000)
Count Down 2001 Hello Good－bye (March 28, 2001)
Kingdom Chapter I: Grateful Birth (November 16, 2001)
Kingdom Chapter II: Never Ending Dream (November 16, 2001)
The Alfee History IV 1997～2001 (March 27, 2002)
Legend of The Stadium V Gold Legend (November 20, 2002)
Legend of The Stadium V Silver Legend (November 20, 2002)
Yokohama Swinging Generation: Generation Dynamite Day Aug.16 (November 19, 2003)
Yokohama Swinging Generation: Swinging Generation Day Aug.17 (November 19, 2003)

LD
Over Drive 1983 Alfee 8.24 Budokan (October 21, 1983)
Flying Away Alfee in Yokohama Stadium 1984.8.3 Fri (September 21, 1984)
Alfee 3 Days 1985.8/27/28/29 Yokohama Stadium (October 15, 1985)
The Alfee 1986 8.3 Sweat & Tears Tokyo Bay-Area (October 5, 1986)
Sunset－Sunrise 1987 Aug.8-9 (September 30, 1987)
Meigaku Live 3 November 1987 (June 21, 1988)
All Over Japan 4 Access Area 1988 (October 5, 1988)
U.S. Camp Drake ASC The ALfee 1989.8.13 Sun (October 4, 1989)
Bridge Across the Future Reel I (October 3, 1990)
Bridge Across the Future Reel II (October 3, 1990)
The Alfee History I 1982～1985 (October 3, 1990)
Long Way to Freedom Revolution II & Smile Photo Collection (March 27, 1991)
10th Summer: Since 199110 回目の夏 －Since 1991- (10kaime no Natsu -Since 1991-) (October 2, 1991)
The Alfee History II 1986～1991 (March 25, 1992)
Just Live! (October 7, 1992)
Video Clips Victory (July 21, 1993)
Victory Stadium Silver Night Special (October 21, 1993)
Victory Stadium Gold Night Special (October 21, 1993)
King's Night Dream Western Conference Final (October 5, 1994)
King's Night Dream Eastern Conference Final (October 5, 1994)
Phantom Night Festival: Red Phantom Eve幻夜祭 Red Phantom Eve (Gen'yosai Red Phantom Eve) (October 4, 1995)
Phantom Night Festival: Blue Phantom Eve幻夜祭 Blue Phantom Eve (Gen'yosai Blue Phantom Eve) (October 4, 1995)
Yokohama Red Bricks I (October 2, 1996)
Yokohama Red Bricks II (October 2, 1996)
The Alfee Classics: FusionThe Alfee Classics ～融合～ (The Alfee Classics ~Yūgō~) (March 19, 1997)
Emotional Field Heat & Beat Emotion I (October 16, 1997)
Emotional Field Heat & Beat Emotion II (October 16, 1997)
The Alfee History III 1992～1997 (October 17, 1997)
Tokyo One Night Dream (October 16, 1998)
The Alfee in NY at Forest Hills Stadium 1st. July.1998 (December 16, 1998)
Millennium Carnival I (October 14, 1999)
Millennium Carnival II (November 17, 1999)
The Alfee in Berlin at Brandenburg Tour 26th, September 1999 (December 22, 1999)

DVD
Over Drive 1983 Alfee 8.24 Budokan (October 21, 1983)
Flying Away Alfee in Yokohama Stadium 1984.8.3 Fri (September 21, 1984)
Alfee 3 Days 1985.8/27/28/29 Yokohama Stadium (October 15, 1985)
The Alfee 1986 8.3 Sweat & Tears Tokyo Bay-Area (October 5, 1986)
Sunset－Sunrise 1987 Aug.8-9 (September 30, 1987)
All Over Japan 4 Access Area 1988 (October 5, 1988)
U.S. Camp Drake ASC The ALfee 1989.8.13 Sun (October 4, 1989)
Bridge Across the Future Reel I (October 3, 1990)
Bridge Across the Future Reel II (October 3, 1990)
10th Summer: Since 199110 回目の夏 －Since 1991- (10kaime no Natsu -Since 1991-) (October 2, 1991)
The Alfee History II 1986～1991 (March 25, 1992)
Just Live! (October 7, 1992)
Victory Stadium Silver Night Special (October 21, 1993)
Victory Stadium Gold Night Special (October 21, 1993)
King's Night Dream Western Conference Final (October 5, 1994)
King's Night Dream Eastern Conference Final (October 5, 1994)
Phantom Night Festival: Red Phantom Eve幻夜祭 Red Phantom Eve (Gen'yosai Red Phantom Eve) (October 4, 1995)
Phantom Night Festival: Blue Phantom Eve幻夜祭 Blue Phantom Eve (Gen'yosai Blue Phantom Eve) (October 4, 1995)
Yokohama Red Bricks I (October 2, 1996)
Yokohama Red Bricks II (October 2, 1996)
Emotional Field Heat & Beat Emotion I (October 16, 1997)
Emotional Field Heat & Beat Emotion II (October 16, 1997)
Tokyo One Night Dream (October 16, 1998)
The Alfee in NY at Forest Hills Stadium 1st. July.1998 (December 16, 1998)
Millennium Carnival I (October 14, 1999)
Millennium Carnival II (November 17, 1999)
The Alfee in Berlin at Brandenburg Tour 26th, September 1999 (December 22, 1999)
Tokyo Aube Stadium Alfee Classics Night (October 16, 2000)
Tokyo Aube Stadium Alfee Rockdom Night (October 16, 2000)
The Alfee: The Best Ten & "The Surprise on that Day!" Complete Edition 2000THE ALFEE ザ・ベストテン＆「ある日ィ突然！」Complete edition 2000 (The ALfee Za Besuto Ten & "Aru Hii Totsuzen!" Complete Edition 2000) (December 22, 2000)
Count Down 1997 Emotion Live at Budokan Dec.24 (December 22, 2000)
Count Down 1998 Nouvelle Vague Live at Budokan Dec.24 (December 22, 2000)
Final Count Down A.D.1999 Live at Budokan Dec.24 (December 22, 2000)
Count Down 2001 Hello Good－bye (March 28, 2001)
Kingdom Chapter I: Grateful Birth (November 16, 2001)
Kingdom Chapter II: Never Ending Dream (November 16, 2001)
The Alfee History IV 1997～2001 (March 27, 2002)
Legend of The Stadium V Gold Legend (November 20, 2002)
Legend of The Stadium V Silver Legend (November 20, 2002)
Yokohama Swinging Generation Generation Dynamite Day Aug.16 (November 19, 2003)
Yokohama Swinging Generation: Swinging Generation Day Aug.17 (November 19, 2003)
Aube 2000 Live at Budokan Dec.24 (December 17, 2003)
Aube 2001 Glint Beat Live at Budokan Dec.24 (January 21, 2004)
Aube 2002 Transformation Live at Budokan Dec.24 (April 14, 2004)
The Alfee 30th Anniversary Video Clips II (September 15, 2004)
The Alfee History I-III DVD Box Special Edition (September 15, 2004)
The Alfee 30th Anniversary Travelin' Band Live at NHK Hall May 30 (October 14, 2004)
Love & Peace: A Day of Love Aug.14 (November 7, 2004)
Love & Peace: A Day of Peace Aug.15 (November 7, 2004)
30th Anniversary Count Down: Time and Tide (March 30, 2005)

BE∀T BOYS Discography

Singles
 [1981.08.05] Stars☆On 23 (スターズ☆オン23) (BEAT BOYS) 
 [1988.11.02] HE∀RTBRE∀K LONELY R∀IN 
 [1989.05.31] Dare Yori mo Lady Jane (誰よりもLady Jane; Lady Jane Over Anyone Else) 
 [1990.07.21] Futari Dake no Yoru (ふたりだけの夜; Night for Only Us) 
 [1996.04.03] Epicurean (エピキュリアン) 
 [1997.03.19] May Be

Albums
 [1988.10.21] BE∀T BOYS TOJO!!
 [1989.07.05] GO!GO! BE∀T BOYS!!
 
Videos
 [1989.10.21] GRE∀T PROMOTION

External links 
 Alfee.com (in Japanese)
 Alfee Mania (official fan club, in Japanese)
 HMV Japan "Top 100 Japanese pops Artists" (in Japanese)
 A journey to the roots of The Alfee (in Japanese)
 Romanized lyrics

Japanese rock music groups
Japanese progressive rock groups
Japanese pop rock music groups
Musical groups established in 1973
Musical groups from Tokyo
EMI Music Japan artists